MI-9, MI9, MI 9 may refer to:

 MI9, British Military Intelligence Section 9
 Mi9 (company), an Australian digital media company, fully owned subsidiary of Nine Entertainment Co.
 Mil Mi-9, a variant of the Mil Mi-8 helicopter
 Michigan's 9th congressional district
 M-9 (Michigan highway), a former designation for portions of M-99
 M.I.9, a spy agency in the TV series M.I. High
Xiaomi Mi 9, an Android phone